Rouault is a surname. Notable people with the surname include:

Georges Rouault (1871–1958), French painter, draughtsman, and print artist
Sébastien Rouault (born 1986), French freestyle swimmer
Joachim Rouault (died 1478), French soldier

Surnames of Breton origin
Germanic-language surnames